The Hon. George Wentworth-FitzWilliam (3 May 1817 – 4 March 1874), was a British politician.

Background
Wentworth-FitzWilliam was a younger son of Charles Wentworth-FitzWilliam, 5th Earl FitzWilliam, and Mary, daughter of Thomas Dundas, 1st Baron Dundas. William Wentworth-FitzWilliam, 6th Earl FitzWilliam and Charles Wentworth-FitzWilliam were his brothers.

Political career
Wentworth-FitzWilliam was Member of Parliament (MP) for Richmond in 1841 and for Peterborough between 1841 and 1859. He served as High Sheriff of Northamptonshire for 1866.

Family
Wentworth-FitzWilliam married Alice Louisa, daughter of the Hon. George Anson, in 1865. They had several children, including George Charles FitzWilliam, father of Thomas Wentworth-Fitzwilliam, the 10th and last Earl Fitzwilliam. Wentworth-Fitzwilliam died in March 1874, aged 56. His wife survived him by five years and died in January 1879.

References

External links 
 

1817 births
1874 deaths
Younger sons of earls
Members of the Parliament of the United Kingdom for English constituencies
UK MPs 1841–1847
UK MPs 1847–1852
UK MPs 1852–1857
UK MPs 1857–1859
High Sheriffs of Northamptonshire